Miloslav František Michael Fleischmann  (September 4, 1886 – August 12, 1955) was a Czechoslovak ice hockey player who competed in the 1924 Winter Olympics.

In 1924 he participated with the Czechoslovak team in the first Winter Olympics ice hockey tournament. His elder brother Jan was also a member of the squad.

External links
Olympic ice hockey tournaments 1924 

1886 births
1939 deaths
Czechoslovak ice hockey right wingers
HC Slavia Praha players
Ice hockey people from Prague
Ice hockey players at the 1924 Winter Olympics
Olympic ice hockey players of Czechoslovakia
Czech ice hockey right wingers
People from the Kingdom of Bohemia